Sarah Jung Yeon Lee (Korean 이정연) (born 16 February 1979 in London, England) is a South Korean professional golfer.  She became a professional in 1998.

Personal
Lee majored in Physical Education at Kyung Hee University.  She currently resides in Windermere, Florida.

Professional wins

LPGA of Korea Tour wins
1999 SBS Championship

Futures Tour wins
2001 Innerform Golf Challenge, FUTURES Golf Classic at Green Mountain National

Team appearances
Professional
Lexus Cup (representing Asia team): 2007 (winners), 2008

External links

Biography on seoulsisters.com

South Korean female golfers
LPGA of Korea Tour golfers
LPGA Tour golfers
Golfers from London
1979 births
Living people